Conrad Pochhammer (22 September 1873 – 25 March 1923) was a German physician and surgeon.

1873 births
1932 deaths
People from Gryfice
People from the Province of Pomerania
19th-century German physicians
German surgeons
20th-century German physicians